Contact/II, or simply Contact II, was an American magazine from New York. Established in 1976, the periodical was primarily directed and edited by Maurice Kenny and J G Gosciak. Contact II published reviews, interviews, and poetry.

It has been said that Kenny has immensely contributed to "the growth of multicultural literatures of North America in his work as an editor [...] and as a mentor to emerging writers of color." Alex Jacobs, an Native American poet, said that Kenny helped emerging poets receive funding from the New York State Council on the Arts. Kenny also often published new poets in Contact II and Strawberry Press.

Contact II also supported the feminist movement of the late '70s and 80's. The magazine published a special edition on women's writing and only included works by and about women for that issue. It featured articles about Audre Lorde, Laura Riding, and Judy Grahn, as well as poems by Carol Berge, Ntozake Shange, Rachal Hadas, Sharon Olds, Joan Colby, Frances Chung, Carolyn Stoloff, Wanda Coleman, and many others.

References

Biannual magazines published in the United States
Defunct literary magazines published in the United States
Magazines established in 1976
Magazines published in New York City
Magazines with year of disestablishment missing